Cavadinești is a commune in Galați County, Western Moldavia, Romania with a population of 3,520 people. It is composed of four villages: Cavadinești, Comănești, Gănești and Vădeni.

References

Communes in Galați County
Localities in Western Moldavia
Populated places on the Prut